Boletus harrisonii is a fungus of the genus Boletus native to the United States. It was first described officially in 1971 by mycologists Alexander H. Smith and Harry Delbert Thiers. It is named after Canadian mycologist Kenneth A. Harrison, who collected the type specimens.

See also
 List of Boletus species
 List of North American boletes

References

harrisonii
Fungi described in 1971
Fungi of the United States
Fungi without expected TNC conservation status